State Route 346 (SR 346) is a  state highway in Hawkins and Sullivan counties in the eastern part of the U.S. state of Tennessee. It connects Surgoinsville with Kingsport.

Route description
SR 346 begins in Hawkins County at an intersection with US 11W/SR 1 in Surgoinsville and heads northeast through downtown and has a second intersection with US 11W/SR 1 and turns east onto US 11W/SR 1. The three routes begin a concurrency to Church Hill and then it turns northeast onto Main Street and then turns north onto North Central Avenue. and continues until it leaves the city limits of Church Hill, where it becomes Carter's Valley Road and crosses over the North Fork Holston River into Sullivan County and it meets its northern terminus, an intersection with US 23/SR 36/SR 137 on the north side of Kingsport just  from the Virginia state-line.

Major intersections

See also
 
 
 List of state routes in Tennessee

References

346
Transportation in Hawkins County, Tennessee
Transportation in Sullivan County, Tennessee
Kingsport, Tennessee